Březina is a municipality and village in Brno-Country District in the South Moravian Region of the Czech Republic. It has about 1,100 inhabitants.

History
The first written mention of Březina is from 1365. The village of Proseč was first mentioned in 1395. In 1950, both villages were merged into one municipality. Since 1 January 2007, Březina has been no longer part of Blansko District and became part of the Brno-Country District.

Twin towns – sister cities

Březina is twinned with:
 Valaská Dubová, Slovakia

References

Villages in Brno-Country District